The Adventures of Elmo in Grouchland was published by NewKidCo for Game Boy Color and Mattel Media for Windows in 1999. This game is a platforming side scroller based on the movie of the same name.

Gameplay 
There are eight side-scrolling platform levels in Elmo in Grouchland, and each one is very short. The player generally spends each level hopping over obstacles such as fire hydrants. Along with the eight platforming levels are two alternate style levels, each one different. In one, the player is sitting in a minecart and has to duck the low ceilings as the mine cart moves forward. The other involves Elmo falling into Grouchland. The player moves Elmo left and right, helping him to avoid trash.

CD-ROM version 
The Adventures of Elmo in Grouchland was also released as a Sesame Street CD-ROM game for home computers. The game was published by Mattel Media in October 1999, and re-released by Encore Software and Sesame Workshop in 2005. Travel with Elmo to recover his lost blanket in Grouchland. Concepts introduced include sharing and friendship, while skills such as problem solving, observation, prediction, and spatial relations are emphasized.

References 

1999 video games
Game Boy Color games
Sesame Street video games
Ubisoft games
Video games developed in the United States
Windows games
Children's educational video games
Mattel video games
Encore Software games
Single-player video games
NewKidCo games